Rostoklaty is a municipality and village in Kolín District in the Central Bohemian Region of the Czech Republic. It has about 600 inhabitants.

Administrative parts
The village of Nová Ves II is an administrative part of Rostoklaty.

References

Villages in Kolín District